Joutseno Church is a church designed by Josef Stenbäck located in Joutseno, Lappeenranta, Finland. The church was built in 1921.

References

External links 
 

Lappeenranta
Josef Stenbäck buildings
Lutheran churches in Finland
Gothic Revival church buildings in Finland
Buildings and structures in South Karelia
Churches completed in 1921